Türkmenuşağı is a small village in Silifke district of Mersin Province, Turkey. It is situated in the southern slopes of the Taurus Mountains. The population of Türkmenuşağı was 84 as of 2012. Major economic activity of the village is farming  and animal breeding.

References

Villages in Silifke District